Grazielia is a genus of South American flowering plants in the family Asteraceae.

The genus is named for Brazilian botanist Graziela Maciel Barroso.

All the known species are native to Brazil. Grazielia intermedia occurs also in Paraguay, G. serrata also in Uruguay, Paraguay, and Argentina.

Species
According to Global Compositae Checklist;

Kew also lists;
 Grazielia brevipetiolata 
 Grazielia coriacea

References

Asteraceae genera
Flora of South America
Eupatorieae